Nuzividu railway station is located near the town of Hanuman Junction. It is about 23 km from Nuzividu. It is under Vijayawada railway division of South Central Railway. It halts 18 trains every day.

Passenger amenities
It has three platforms which serves up and down trains. It has a general ticket booking counter. First platform has cement seating for passengers. It also has a general waiting hall on first platform. Local passenger trains stop at this station.

Electrification
The Visakhapatnam–Vijayawada section was completely electrified by 1997. The Howrah–Chennai route was completely electrified by 2005.

References

External links
Train arrivals at Nuzvid

Railway stations in Krishna district
Vijayawada railway division